The 2001 Cyprus Rally (formally the 29th Cyprus Rally) was the sixth round of the 2001 World Rally Championship. The race was held over three days between 1 June and 3 June 2001, and was won by Ford's Colin McRae, his 22nd win in the World Rally Championship.

Background

Entry list

Itinerary
All dates and times are EEST (UTC+3).

Results

Overall

World Rally Cars

Classification

Special stages

Championship standings

FIA Cup for Production Rally Drivers

Classification

Special stages

Championship standings

References

External links 
 Official website of the World Rally Championship

Cyprus
Cyprus Rally
2001 in Cypriot sport